The Aeros del Sur Manta is an Argentine ultralight trike, designed and produced by Aeros del Sur. The aircraft is supplied as a  complete ready-to-fly-aircraft.

Design and development
Aeros del Sur is the importer of Aeros products for Argentina. The Manta was designed by mating the Aeros Profi trike wing with a new, locally designed carriage. It features a cable-braced hang glider-style high-wing, weight-shift controls, a two-seats-in-tandem, open cockpit, tricycle landing gear with wheel pants and a single engine in pusher configuration.

The aircraft is made from a mix of bolted-together aluminum and steel tubing, with its double surface wing covered in Dacron sailcloth. Its  span wing is supported by a single tube-type kingpost and uses an "A" frame weight-shift control bar. The standard powerplant is a twin cylinder, liquid-cooled, two-stroke, dual-ignition  Rotax 582 engine, but the HKS 700E four-stroke, dual-ignition  engine is optional, as are Hirth and Simonini powerplants.

Specifications (Manta)

References

External links

2000s Argentine ultralight aircraft
Single-engined pusher aircraft
Ultralight trikes